Commotio can refer to:

 Commotio (Nielsen), organ work composed 1930–1931
 Commotio cordis, heart injury
 Commotio retinae, known as Berlin's edema
 Commotio cerebri, medical name for concussion